Frank A. Delaney IV (born February 4, 1963) is an American stockbroker who was sanctioned by the U.S. Securities and Exchange Commission.

Early life
Frank A. Delaney IV was born on February 4, 1963, in Denville, New Jersey. He is the fifth of six children born to Frank A. Delaney III and Elise Murphy and attended Delbarton School in Morristown, New Jersey, where he graduated in 1981. He received The Delbarton Leadership Award for excellence in Academics being a leader among his peers on and off the athletic fields. Delaney graduated from Gettysburg College in 1986 with a bachelor's degree in Political Science. Delaney played three years of baseball as a catcher for Gettysburg College, winning the 1986 Middle Atlantic Conference Championship in 1986. The entire team was entered into the Gettysburg College Athletic Hall of Athletic Honor in 1996.

Career
In November 1989, Delaney became a member of the New York Stock Exchange and was a Senior Managing Director at Henderson Brothers, Inc., and Bear Wagner.

Delaney was awarded the Excalibur Award by the National Cancer Society on five occasions (1998, 2000, 2001, 2002) and was honored by the American Cancer Society in 2003 at their Annual Northeastern Ball. Delaney spent four years on the Board of Gettysburg College. Delaney also served for six years on the board of the Mental Health Association of Monmouth County.

References

1963 births
Delbarton School alumni
Gettysburg College alumni
American financiers
Living people